Antoine de Lomenie, lord of La Ville-aux-Clerics (1560 - 17 January 1638 Paris) was a Secretary of the Navy under Louis XIII of 7 November 1613 to 10 August 1615, and Ambassador Extraordinary of France to England.

He was the son of Martial Lomenie, Seigneur de Versailles (†1572 in the St. Bartholomew's Day massacre, Paris) and Jacqueline Pinault.

He was Secrétaire d'État of Navarre 1595–1613.

He was, in the judgment of Adina Ruiu, "a disciple and an old friend of the Jesuits for whom he never missed a chance to do a favor".

He married on 1 October 1593 with Anne of Aubourg, lady Porcheux 1608; they had children:
 Henri-Auguste de 1595-1666 Lomenie
 Catherine Henriette 1667
 Marie Antoinette

References
 Dugat, Gustave / Havet, Julien / Houdas, Octave Victor / Silvestre de Sacy, Antoine Isaac baron / Latouche, Emmanuel / Longueville, Edme Paul Marcellin : Notices et Extraits des Manuscrits de la Bibliothèque du Roi, Lûs au Comité établi par Sa Majesté dans l’Académie royale des Inscriptions & Belles Lettres, Tome Deuxième, Paris, l’Imprimerie Royale, 1789 (in French)

1560 births
1638 deaths
Ministers of Marine and the Colonies
Ambassadors of France to England
16th-century French people
17th-century French people